Christella hispidula is a species of fern in the Thelypteridaceae family.

References

Thelypteridaceae
Flora of New South Wales
Flora of Queensland